is a Japanese voice actor. He is best known as the voice of Kagome's grandfather in Inuyasha after Ginzo Matsuo's death, and as the voice of Diddy Kong in many of Nintendo's video games since 2004 starting with Mario Power Tennis. He currently works at 81 Produce.

Filmography

Television animation
1992
Macross - Hayao Kakizaki and Warera Nantes

1993
YuYu Hakusho - Elder Toguro

1994
YAT Anshin! Uchū Ryokō - Ucchi

1999
Gregory Horror Show - Frog Fortune Teller, Mirror Man

2001
Inuyasha - Grandpa Higurashi (second voice)

2002
Tenchi Muyo! GXP - Mr. Yamada

2003
Kaleido Star - Ben Robbins

2006
Bleach - Ugaki

2020
Yashahime: Princess Half-Demon - Grandpa Higurashi

2021
Let's Make a Mug Too - Jūbe Aoki

Unknown date
Rairai in Mahoujin Guru Guru
Yan in Double Zeta Gundam
Hadat in Ys ~Tenkuu no Shinden~
Mu / Uin Iju in Idol Angel Yokoso Yoko
Nagoya Willow in Nangoku Shōnen Papuwa-kun
Might Gunner in The Brave Express Might Gaine
Umao in Kimagure Orange Road

Original video animation (OVA)
Here is Greenwood (1991) (Bonda, teacher)
Legend of the Galactic Heroes (1991) (Molt)
Idol Defense Force Hummingbird (1993) (Shinobu Ijūin)
Iria: Zeiram the Animation (1994) (Government suit)

Theatrical animation
The Super Dimension Fortress Macross: Do You Remember Love? (1984) (Hayao Kakizaki)
Spriggen (1998) (Little Boy)
Inuyasha the Movie: Affections Touching Across Time (2001) (Grandpa)
Inuyasha the Movie: Swords of an Honorable Ruler (2003) (Grandpa)

Video games
Crash Team Racing (1999) (Ripper Roo (Dallas McKennon))
Donkey Kong series (2007–present) (Diddy Kong)
Gregory Horror Show (2003) (Frog Fortune Teller)
Philosoma (1995) (D3)
Soul Nomad & the World Eaters (2007) (Vangogh)
Super Mario Bros. series (2004–present) (Diddy Kong)
Stupid Invaders (2001) (Stereo Monovici, Nelson)
Super Robot Wars series (2000–present) (Hayao Kakizaki, Liebe, Might Gunner, Purple)

Dubbing roles

Live action
Hudson Hawk – Kit Kat (David Caruso)
Mighty Morphin Power Rangers – Alpha 5 (Richard Steven Horvitz)
She-Wolf of London – Villager
Small Soldiers – Slamfist (Christopher Guest)
Star Wars: Episode III – Revenge of the Sith – Nute Gunray (Silas Carson)
Triloquist – The Dummy (Bruce Weitz)

Animation
Batman: The Animated Series – Ted Dymer
CatDog – Eddie the Squirrel
Corpse Bride – William Van Dort
Courage the Cowardly Dog – The Great Fusilli
Cow and Chicken – Red Guy, Flem
Dexter's Laboratory – Mandark
Finding Nemo – Tad's Dad
Justice League – Copperhead
The Powerpuff Girls (UG dub) – Mayor, Him, Ace
Rocko's Modern Life: Static Cling – Mr. Dupette
Rolie Polie Olie – Additional Voices
The Ren & Stimpy Show – Haggis McHaggis
Sitting Ducks – Waddle
South Park – Tweek Tweak (Season 2)
Space Goofs – Stereo Monovici
Squirrel Boy – Leon
Wallace & Gromit: The Curse of the Were-Rabbit – PC Macintosh
Who Framed Roger Rabbit – Bugs Bunny, Droopy, Greasy
The Wild Thornberries – Darwin, Donnie

References

External links

1956 births
Living people
Japanese male voice actors
Male voice actors from Aichi Prefecture
20th-century Japanese male actors
21st-century Japanese male actors
81 Produce voice actors